Bosse "Bo" Granath is a Swedish former Grand Prix motorcycle road racer. His most successful competitive year was 1972, when he finished fifth in the 500cc world championship riding a Husqvarna motorcycle.

Biography and career
Bo Granath drove his first national race in 1960. In the winter, while doing military service, he bought a 500cc Norton 30M (Manx) for the 1961 season. He had a junior license, but because there were so few junior drivers the seniors ride along. In Karlskoga he immediately became fourth behind three senior drivers, but with a lap behind. He also bought a 350cc Norton 40M for the second Swedish champion race. In Falkenberg, he finished fourth in both classes. In the Swedish championship, he was fifth in both classes. He applied for an international license to be allowed to start in the Grand Prix of Sweden.

1962 was a school year for Granath, with a lot of bad luck and poor results, but thanks to his international license he was able to start in many foreign races. He rode a number of international races in Belgium and the Netherlands, the Ulster Grand Prix and the GP of East Germany, but his best result was 13th place on the Sachsenring.

In 1963 he bought a 350cc AJS 7R and a 500cc Matchless G50. These machines were found to be fast and reliable. He went to Britain to ride at Silverstone, Snetterton and Oulton Park and was impressed by the speeds in the British races. In Oulton Park, some riders drove him on three laps, but he learned a lot and in August he went to Oulton again. In the meantime, he had also driven the TT van Man for the first time. He experienced a perilous moment when a gas line broke at the Highlander. The gasoline came on the open primary chainrightly, caught fire and the front of the AJS caught fire. Granath looked at a wall of fire but did not dare to jump off his engine at about 180 km/hour. He slid over the back of his saddle, set his feet on the road, and steered the machine by holding the saddle until he dared to drop. The AJS crashed into a wall at Glen Helen. Granath sustained severe burns on an arm and foot and had to recover for a long time.

In 1964 he won his first race, the 500cc race in Falkenberg, but he crashed hard in Oulton Park and got fear of still racing. As a result, he performed poorly throughout the season and his anxiety persisted until mid-1965. Only after the Man's TT did his fears disappear, strangely enough, because he had learned to drive with two wheels in Man. He now had an MZ RE 125 in addition to the AJS and the Matchless. In 1965 he managed to win his first Swedish championship titles: in the 125cc and 500cc classes. In 1966 he again became Swedish 125cc champion.

In 1967 he had a very good season. He became Swedish champion in three classes and scored his first World Championship points in the Grand Prix road race of Finland when he finished fourth in the pouring rain in the 500cc class. He was almost third but got problems with his clutch so he had to let Billie Nelson pass. Two days before this race, Bo Granath's first son Peter was born. Earlier in the season, he had finished seventh in the - also wet - Belgian Grand Prix, but in that time only the first six finishers received points. In this season he also started Husqvarna 's for the first time: in the 250cc class and the 350cc class came out with single-cylinders from the Swedish brand. The frames were built by Bertil Persson. He won almost all Swedish races with the 350cc machine.

In 1968 he asked the Husqvarna engineer Ruben Helmin to build a 500cc two-cylinder. This machine was ready by the end of the season and Granath won the last two Swedish races. He became Swedish champion in the 350cc class.

In 1969, Granath rode a fairly full GP season. For the 125cc race in the French GP, he even got a YZ 623 prototype from Yamaha, with which he managed to take the lead in the race until he failed with a broken crankshaft. His air-cooled Husqvarna 500 two-cylinder engine was still very unreliable and he only scored four World Championship points this year thanks to his seventh place in the 125cc Grand Prix of Belgium.

For the 1970 season, Bo Granath purchased two Yamahas for the 250 and 350cc classes. In his first 250cc race in France, he immediately became sixth, but also second Yamaha driver behind factory driver Rodney Gould. He finished the season with a ninth place in the 250cc class. The Husqvarna was still not reliable, but it did bring him the Swedish title in the 500cc class.

The opening race of the 1971 season, the Austrian GP, went very well, with a fifth place in the 350cc class and a sixth place in the 250cc class. Granath finished seventh in the 350cc class. Also in the 500cc class, it went better now that the Husqvarna remained intact a little more often: he became 15th. It was the season in which the 500cc two-stroke engines became stronger, but it was Kawasaki H 1 500 Mach IIIs and Suzuki T 500s that set the tone. Giacomo Agostini was still supreme with his MV Agusta 500 3C. Granath scored the first World Championship points for Husqvarna in the 500cc class during theTT van Assen, in which he finished eighth behind.

A new 500cc engine appeared in 1972: drivers discovered that a lightly drilled Yamaha TR 3 was a good weapon to beat the 500cc machines due to its manoeuvrability and low weight. After the two Agustini and Alberto Pagani MV Agustas, Bruno Kneubühler and Rodney Gould took third and fourth place in the championship with these machines. However, the Huqvarna from Bo Granath was now very reliable. He even had to cross away from a few results and became fifth in the world championship. In the GP of Austria and the GP of Sweden, he achieved his only podium places.

With the arrival of the factory Yamaha TZ 500 and the König by Kim Newcombe, it was difficult in 1973 to score points in the 500cc class. Granath also often dropped out and scored only 12 points.

In 1974, the Husqvarna was definitely no longer fast enough to score points. Granath only dropped out once but remained scoreless. From that moment he started driving fewer and fewer GPs. Remarkably, he started in three classes in 1975 in the TT van Man, a race that in the meantime was boycotted by almost everyone because of the dangerous circuit. In the 1976 season, Bo Granath scored his last World Cup points: he finished ninth in the 350cc GP of Yugoslavia. In 1977 he became Swedish champion in the 750cc class.

References 

1939 births
Sportspeople from Stockholm
Swedish motorcycle racers
125cc World Championship riders
250cc World Championship riders
350cc World Championship riders
500cc World Championship riders
Isle of Man TT riders
Living people